The Merry-Go-Round was an American psychedelic rock, Los Angeles based band, best known for the singer-songwriter Emitt Rhodes and featuring Joel Larson on drums, Gary Kato on lead guitar, and Bill Rinehart on bass. The group gained inspiration from bands like the Beatles, the Byrds, and the Left Banke for its vocal harmonies and instrumental acquisitions. They used their contemporaries' styles to create their own sound.

History
The band formed in the summer of 1966. Emitt Rhodes had left his former band, the Palace Guard, and began jam sessions with Gary Kato and friends. Within weeks, they were joined by Bill Rinehart, formerly of the Leaves and Joel Larson, formerly of the Grass Roots.

Recorded demos resulted in the band being signed by A&M Records. By early 1967, the band released their first single "Live"/"Time Will Show the Wiser". "Live" became a sensation in L.A. and reached number 63 on the Billboard Hot 100. The group's next single, "You're a Very Lovely Woman", highly arranged and orchestrated, only reached number 94. A&M, noticing the disappointing listing, hastily released their debut album before the window of opportunity closed.

The band released their only album, The Merry-Go-Round in November 1967. It stalled, reaching only number 190 and soon after Rinehart departed. He was replaced by Rick Dey of the Vejtables. Several further singles, including "She Laughed Loud"/"Had to Run Around", "Come Ride, Come Ride"/"She Laughed Loud", "Listen, Listen"/"Missing You" and "'Til the Day After"/"Highway" would be released in 1967 and 1968 but failed to chart. They started work on a second album but never completed it. After fan interest in the group dissipated, they decided to disband in 1969.

Legacy
The Merry-Go-Round performed at the Fantasy Fair and Magic Mountain Music Festival in 1967 on both days of the music festival. They closed the show on Saturday June 10 and were the second to the show closer on Sunday June 11. This music festival is important for it was a blueprint for future rock concerts of the same scale.

"You're a Very Lovely Woman" was covered in 1971 by Linda Ronstadt on Capitol single 3021 as "(She's A) Very Lovely Woman."

"Live" was covered by the Bangles on their 1984 album All Over the Place and "Time Will Show the Wiser" was recorded by Fairport Convention on their debut album in 1968, a song still played regularly by Fairport at their Cropredy Festival.

A 14 song 'best of' album was released by Rhino Records in 1985.

A CD containing their only LP and other existing material was issued in 2005 on Rev-Ola Records.

Their only album was reissued in April 2010 by Sundazed Records, which was remastered from original analog tapes in high quality vinyl.

Discography
 The Merry-Go-Round (1967, Billboard 200 No. 190

Singles
 "Live" (1967) – US Billboard Hot 100 No. 63
 "Time Will Show the Wiser" (1967)
 "You're a Very Lovely Woman" – (1967) US Billboard Hot 100 No. 94
 "She Laughed Loud"
 "Listen, Listen"
 "'Til the Day After"

References

External links
 [ AllMusic profile of the Merry-Go-Round]
 Joel-Larson.com

A&M Records artists
Musical groups established in 1966
Musical groups disestablished in 1969
Musical groups from Los Angeles
Psychedelic rock music groups from California